Gleb Sakharov (born 10 June 1988) is a Soviet-born French tennis player. 

Sakharov has a career-high ATP singles ranking of world No. 153 achieved on 8 January 2018. He also has a career-high doubles ranking of world No. 385 achieved on 11 June 2012. Sakharov has won 11 ITF Futures singles titles and 9 ITF Futures doubles titles.

Sakharov made his ATP main draw debut at the 2017 Swiss Open Gstaad, where he qualified for the main draw and won his first-round match against Swiss Antoine Bellier.

Challenger and Futures finals

Singles: 31 (11–20)

Doubles: 18 (9–9)

External links
 
 

1988 births
Living people
French male tennis players
Uzbekistani male tennis players
Sportspeople from Nantes
Sportspeople from Tashkent
French people of Uzbekistani descent
Uzbekistani emigrants to France